Archery competitions at the 2023 Pan American Games in Santiago, Chile will be held between November 1 and 5, 2023 at the Archery center in Peñalolén.

The highest ranked athlete in each individual recurve event (that has not yet qualified) will earn a quota spot for their country at the 2024 Summer Olympics in Paris, France along with the top mixed recurve team.

Qualification

A total of 98 archers will qualify to compete at the games (49 per gender). A country may enter a maximum of ten archers (five per gender). As host nation, Chile qualified eight athletes automatically (3 for the men’s and women's recurve event each, 1 for the men’s and women’s compound event each). Four qualification tournaments will be used to determine the 66 qualifiers in recurve and 32 in compound.

Participating nations
A total of 15 countries qualified athletes so far.

Medal summary

Medalists

Recurve

Compound

See also
Archery at the 2024 Summer Olympics

References

External links
Results book

 
Archery
Pan American Games
2023